RSI Rete Due is the second Italian-language radio station from Radiotelevisione svizzera di lingua italiana (RSI). It was launched in 1985.

Its headquarters are at the RSI-building in Lugano-Besso, reaching a daily average of between 26,000 and 28,000 listeners. Thus, it has a market share of 5.8%.

The programming is mainly focused on classical music and culture, much like Radio SRF 2 Kultur and Espace 2.

It broadcasts on FM and DAB, but also via satellite and online.

Programmes
 Verde Aurora
 Laser
 Agenda classica
 La citazione
 Geronimo
 Finestra Aperta
 Colpo di scena
 Rete 2-5
 Rete Due Informa
 Il pifferaio magico
 Prima fila
 Birdland
 Disco volante
 Concerto dell'OSI

See also 
Radiotelevisione svizzera di lingua italiana
RSI Rete Uno
RSI Rete Tre

Notes and references

External links 
 

Radio stations established in 1985
Italian-language radio stations in Switzerland
Mass media in Lugano
1985 establishments in Switzerland